The Charles E. Simons Jr. Federal Court House is located in Aiken, South Carolina. It is significant for its association with the many federal construction programs of the Great Depression era. The building, designed by Columbia, South Carolina architects Lafaye and Lafaye, is an excellent example of a Georgian Revival building, a style often used during the 1920s and 1930s for government buildings in smaller towns. The Court House was listed in the National Register of Historic Places on December 10, 2003.

The building was named for District Court judge Charles Earl Simons Jr. in 1986.

References

Courthouses on the National Register of Historic Places in South Carolina
Colonial Revival architecture in South Carolina
Government buildings completed in 1935
Buildings and structures in Aiken, South Carolina
Federal courthouses in the United States
National Register of Historic Places in Aiken County, South Carolina